Jersey Basketball Association (JBBA) is the governing body of the sport of basketball in Jersey.  The Jersey Basketball Association facilitates competitive opportunities for the sport and has U17, U21, Men's and Women's teams that represent the Island of Jersey.

The teams have been playing in an annual Inter Insular match against Guernsey Basketball since 1970 where each Island takes turn to host.

The Jersey Basketball Association has put forward representative teams to play in the Natwest International Island Games

History 

Jersey Men's Team have played in the following Island Games

 2015 Island Games in Jersey
 2017 Island Games in Gotland placing 7th out of 11 teams
 2019 Island Games in Gibraltar placing 7th out of 11 teams

Jersey Women's Team have played in the following Island Games

 2015 Island Games in Jersey placing 7th out f 7 teams
 2017 Island Games in Gotland placing 7th out of 7 teams
 2019 Island Games in Gibraltar playing 7th out of 7 teams

See also
 International Island Games Association

References

External links 
 

Basketball governing bodies in Europe
Basketball